"Friends" is a song by Australian musician Flume, released on 27 March 2019 through Future Classic. It features vocals from American rapper Reo Cragun, and was released a week after the Hi This Is Flume mixtape.

Reception
Music Feeds said the song "marks a return to [Flume's] more experimental side".

Charts

References

2019 singles
2019 songs
Flume (musician) songs
Future Classic singles
Song recordings produced by Flume (musician)
Songs written by Flume (musician)